Ronald Vernon Sceney (12 October 1917 – 2 April 2003) was an Australian rules footballer who played with Geelong in the Victorian Football League (VFL).

Sceney also served in the Australian Army during World War Two.

Notes

External links 

1917 births
2003 deaths
Australian rules footballers from Victoria (Australia)
Geelong Football Club players
Australian military personnel of World War II